The Order of the Daughters of the King is an Anglican lay religious order for women founded in New York City in 1885.

It is a sister organization to the Brotherhood of St. Andrew, a comparable men's organization affiliated with the Episcopal Church. Its constitution was said to be close copy of that of the Brotherhood.

History
The order was founded in 1885 by Margaret J. Franklin and her Bible study class at the Church of the Holy Sepulcher in New York. It considered itself "an order rather than a society" during its early years.

There were 5,000 members as of 1923 and its headquarters were at 84 Bible House, New York City.

The order marked its quasquicentennial or 125 years of existence in 2010.

Membership and organization
The order was originally only open to female members of the Episcopal Church. That rule has since changed to also allow "laywomen...of churches in communion with the Episcopal Church or of churches who are in the Historic Episcopate".

The order has chapters both in the United States and in Augsburg, Germany, Rome, Italy, and Mostoles, Spain.

Members take lifelong vows to follow a "Rule of Life", including a "Rule of Prayer" and a "Rule of Service".

Motto
"For His Sake...
I am but one, but I am one.
I cannot do everything, but I can do something.
What I can do, I ought to do.
What I ought to do, by the grace of God I will do.
Lord, what will you have me do?"

References

External links
Official Website

Episcopal Church (United States)
Anglican organizations established in the 19th century
Anglican religious orders established in the 19th century
Religious organizations established in 1885
Christian women's organizations